The 1982 Furman Paladins football team was an American football team that represented Furman University as a member of the Southern Conference (SoCon) during the 1982 NCAA Division I-AA football season. In their fifth year under head coach Dick Sheridan, the Paladins compiled an overall record of 9–3 with a conference mark of 6–1, winning the SoCon title for the third consecutive season.

Schedule

References

Furman
Furman Paladins football seasons
Southern Conference football champion seasons
Furman Paladins football